Anicius Hermogenianus Olybrius ( 395–397) was a politician and aristocrat of the Roman Empire.

Life
Olybrius was a son of Sextus Petronius Probus, one of the most influential men of his era and consul in 371, and wife and cousin Anicia Faltonia Proba. His brothers were Anicius Probinus and Anicius Petronius Probus. His sister was Anicia Proba.

Olybrius was raised with his brother Probinus in Rome, where he was born. He and his brother Anicius Probinus shared the consulate in 395, while both were very young; Claudian dedicated Panegyricus de consulatu Probini et Olybrii to the brothers on this occasion. Although they belonged to a traditionally pagan senatorial family, Olybrius and Probinus were Christians.

Arusianus Messius dedicated his Exempla elocutionem to both brothers, and Quintus Aurelius Symmachus addressed a letter to both in 397 (Epistles, v).

He married his cousin Anicia Juliana and had: one son, Anicius Probus (fl. 424-459), praetor in 424 and vir illustris in 459, married to Adelphia, daughter of Valerius Adelphius and paternal granddaughter of Valerius Adelphius Bassus (fl. 383 and 392), vir consularis and consul. Venet. in 383 and in 392, and great-granddaughter of Lucius Valerius Septimius Bassus and his possible wife Adelphia, as their son's nomina and cognomen suggest; and one daughter, Demetrias.

Notes

Sources
 Arnold Hugh Martin Jones, John Martindale, John Morris, The Prosopography of the Later Roman Empire (PLRE). vol. 1, Cambridge 1971, p. 639.
 Hartmut Leppin, Theodosius der Große. Wissenschaftliche Buchgesellschaft, Darmstadt 2003, p. 222.

4th-century Christians
4th-century Romans
4th-century Roman consuls
Olybrius, Hermogenianus
Imperial Roman consuls
Year of death unknown